Cerri is an Italian surname. Notable people with the surname include:
Leonardo Cerri (born 2003), Italian footballer
Alberto Cerri (born 1996), Italian footballer
Claudio Cerri (born 1960), Italian cyclist
Dick Cerri (1936–2013), American radio DJ
Franco Cerri (born 1926), Italian guitarist

Italian-language surnames